Indonesia was the first country to be seriously affected by the earthquake and tsunami created by the 2004 Indian Ocean earthquake on 26 December 2004, swamping the northern and western coastal areas of Sumatra, and the smaller outlying islands off Sumatra. Nearly all the casualties and damage took place within the province of Aceh. The time of arrival of the tsunami was between 15 and 30 minutes after the deadly earthquake.

According to the country's National Disaster Relief Coordination Agency, around 130,000 people were dead and 37,063 were missing. In addition, the UN estimated that 655,000 people were homeless and sheltering in scattered refugee camps across the province.

As of January 23, 2005 the Health Ministry reported 173,981 dead while the Social Affairs Ministry registered 114,978 killed. On 25 January 2005 Health Minister Siti Fadilah Supari updated the estimated death total to 220,000.  On 7 April 2005 the estimated number of missing was reduced by more than 50,000 giving a final total of 167,540 dead and missing.

Aftermath 
Northern Sumatra took damage from the earthquake itself as a tsunami landed on it. However, most of the damage was the result of the tsunami that struck the coastal regions of the Aceh and to a much lesser extent the North Sumatra provinces. The west coast of Aceh was about 100 km (60 mi) from the epicenter and took very heavy damage as far south as Tapaktuan. The coastal town of Lhoknga was hit by tsunami waves of more than 20 to 25 meters with run-up heights of more than 30 meters in some places. Ten-meter tall waves passed the northern tip of the island to race south down the Straits of Malacca and strike along the northeast coast as far east as Lhokseumawe.

Reports from those who flew over the Aceh coast reported a virtually destroyed coastline. In many towns and villages, concrete pads were all that was left of substantial structures, while scattered corrugated iron roofs crumpled like paper wore the only evidence of flimsier houses. A few intact mosques rose amazingly from the wasteland.  "You can't really explain. There used to be towns and cities there. All the people once had homes, lives," said Petty Officer 1st Class Scott Wickland from the American aircraft carrier USS Abraham Lincoln. "Now there is nothing."

Relief efforts and communication along the western coastline were complicated because the one road along the coast was disrupted due to the destruction of dozens of bridges and much of the road being washed away or blocked by mud. The western districts of Aceh, lying nearest the epicenter of the magnitude-9 earthquake that caused the tsunami, were a "roadless" area, according to UN Emergency Coordinator Jan Egeland. "The lack of access by road is a key problem aid agencies face in the northern and western parts of Aceh," Chris Lom, a spokesman in the region for the International Organisation for Migration, said on 7 January.  A number of towns on the west coast were therefore cut off from the road from any airport or port. Relief efforts, therefore, required the use of helicopter or boat. In the town of Meulaboh in Aceh, for instance, where thousands are waited for aid, 99 percent of the bridges were gone and 60 percent of asphalt roads awash with mud according to Lom. "An escalation in the number of deaths is almost a certainty," according to William Hyde, Jakarta-based emergency relief coordinator for the International Organisation for Migration. "So much of the coastline couldn't be accessed."

Government officials in Indonesia acknowledged they were forced to make crude estimates of the death toll because of the scale of the devastation and the breakdown of civil governance. They were forced to use such measures as counting the number of bodies in one mass grave and multiplying that by the number of such plots. In other cases, they estimated the population of a village, counted the survivors and assumed the rest were dead. The scale of the breakdown of civil governance was shown by the fact that after a week 1400 policemen were missing in Aceh, and not reported in. The entire provincial government of Aceh, which had its capital at Banda Aceh was reportedly wiped out by the deaths of the provincial legislators, and many government workers.

UN Secretary-General Kofi Annan described the devastation in the Indonesian province of Aceh as the worst he had ever seen, after touring the region by helicopter on Friday 7 January 2005.

Banda Aceh 

Banda Aceh was a city with a population of about 264,000 inhabitants before the tsunami. The majority of the casualties were in the city. Around 60,000 people were confirmed killed in the capital of Banda Aceh alone, the government announced.
Over one thousand bodies found on the streets in the provincial capital of Banda Aceh were placed in mass graves without waiting for identification as officials quickly tried to keep the sanitation situation from worsening.

Leupung 

Leupung -- sometimes spelt "Leupueng", is a town in the district (Kabupaten/Kota) of Aceh Besar, close to the city of    Banda Aceh, the capital of the special territory of Aceh. The town was obliterated by the tsunami. Media reports stated that the tsunami was directed by seaside limestone cliffs towards Leupung, which had a population of ten thousand. According to reports nothing vertical and square-edged is left, and the estimated number of survivors was between 200 and 700.

Gleebruk 

Gleebruk (SatPixs) is a village in the district (Kabupaten/Kota) of Aceh Besar just to the southwest of Banda Aceh. It was completely destroyed by the tsunami.

Teunom 

Teunom, a town in the Memphis district of the special territory of Aceh on the island of Sumatra in Indonesia, with a population of about 18,000, was reported to have been damaged so severely that it " vanished completely leaving only scattered shards of concrete" as a result of the tsunami. Officials estimated 8000 of the 18000 population were dead.

Calang 

Calang was badly hit by the tsunami. It was the district capital, but little was left remaining. Only about 30 percent of the townspeople survived. Estimates of the population of Calang largely fall between 9,000 and 12,000. The trail of destruction left by the tsunami extended two kilometers inland from the coast. Whole hills were washed away.

Welfare Minister Alwi Shihab was quoted as saying that it is likely the town of Calang, north of Meulaboh, would be relocated inland.

Meulaboh 

The town of Meulaboh, which had a population of 120,000 before the tsunami, was struck by a series of waves, killing an estimated 40,000 and destroying most parts of the city, according to relief organizers and local government officials. Approximately 50,000 people lost their homes in the region, local government workers seemed to be overwhelmed and there was little sign of coordination with regional authorities. About 5000 took refuge at Meulaboh College but conditions there became steadily worse. An Indonesian Navy ship bringing aid supplies to Meulaboh was forced to turn away after it was unable to dock because the port facilities were destroyed. The small airport nearby was reopened, enabling small aircraft to land there.

Western islands 
Government officials were initially very concerned over the lack of reports from the many small islands dotting the western coast of Sumatra, such as the islands of Simeulue and Nias, among the poorest areas in Indonesia.  However, casualties seemed to be comparatively light in comparison to the mainland of Aceh.

Simeulue Island 
Simeulue was not the tragedy many government officials feared despite its proximity to the quake epicenter. Only five of the 70,000 villagers on Simeulue were killed, all of them in the earthquake that struck at 7:55am last Sunday. Although 90% of the buildings along its coast were destroyed, nobody perished in the five-meter-high walls of water that followed. Local traditions seem to have saved them. Mayor Darmili said villagers on the island were used to earthquakes and tsunamis. A big earthquake last struck in 2002. "Thousands of our people were killed by a tsunami in 1907 and we have many earthquakes here," he said. "Our ancestors have a saying - if there is an earthquake run for your life."

Nias Island
On Nias Island official accounts gave the number of dead at 122 via the Ministry of Health, while various unconfirmed sources (mostly from phone calls by relatives living in Jakarta) reported death tolls of over 600; others said the number was more likely to exceed 1000.   Reports surfaced that the small islets off the coast of Nias island in the Sirombu district were still relatively intact, but high waves still prevented locals from attempting to reach the islands. Confirmation and communications to the islands were further hampered by damage to telecommunication infrastructures, where phone lines were broken and radio networks were said to be down due to bad weather. This infrastructure damage severely hampered the distribution of aid.

Complications owing to Aceh insurgency 

An accurate picture of the damage was made difficult due to the insurgency of the separatist Free Aceh Movement and the Indonesian military crackdown which means that there were relatively few journalists, government offices, or aid workers in northern Sumatra prior to the earthquake. On 27 December the government lifted the 18-month-old ban prohibiting foreign journalists and aid workers from travelling to Aceh. Also on 27 December a spokesperson for the Free Aceh Movement declared a ceasefire so humanitarian aid could reach survivors, and so as not to complicate the already devastating situation, however some expressed doubt that there would be good-faith cooperation between the Free Aceh Movement and the Indonesian military.  Despite losing many soldiers to the tsunami, the military retains a massive presence in the region.

On 6 January the Indonesian military reported that soldiers had been attacked while on humanitarian missions.  The insurgents in turn claimed that the Indonesian military took advantage of the situation. If the clashes continued, it would pose a problem for humanitarian organisations operating outside of the cities near rebel strongholds.  Travel restrictions may be put on foreigners again if the conflict restarts. U.S. Secretary of State Colin Powell warned Indonesia not to use any of the military aid being provided for relief efforts for counterinsurgency efforts.

Effects 

Although Indonesia was the first and worst hit of countries in the region, it was the last to begin receiving relief aid.  Two large aftershocks on Wednesday caused many residents, traumatised by their experience, to flee from the coast. Looting of food was reported throughout this northmost province of Sumatra as aid proved slow to arrive.

Fifteen thousand troops, who were in the region to fight the insurgency, were dispatched to render assistance and to search for survivors. However, many soldiers and their families were themselves killed.  Three days of national mourning were declared.  The Indonesian government declared the local provincial Acehnese government as totally crippled (many local politicians based in Banda Aceh were killed when the tsunami struck the city) and declared that all administrative control would be handled directly from Jakarta.

The unmanageably high number of corpses strewn all over the cities and countrysides, limited resources and time for identifying bodies, and the very real threat of cholera, diphtheria and other diseases prompted emergency workers to create makeshift mass graves. One of the most urgently required supplies were bodybags.

There were significant bottlenecks created by lack of infrastructure and red tape.  The United Nation's Children's Fund reported on Thursday that aid for 200,000 people, including medical supplies, soap and tarpaulin, was being held at Jakarta for a day to clear customs.  The US consul in Medan in southern Sumatra reported that aid there was piling up at the airports of Medan and Banda Aceh because there were not enough trucks to transport it.  Eleven days after the disaster few foreign relief workers or supplies reached the local people in local centres such as Meulaboh, Aceh.

In the immediate aftermath, one of the most pressing concerns was the inability to distribute sufficient aid due to a lack of accessible roads and a shortage of available helicopters. What little aid reached the remote regions of Aceh province trickled in primarily by boat and air.

While the airfield outside Banda Aceh was functioning, most of the other small gravel airfields were damaged by the earthquake and tsunami.  In the first days only two airfields were functioning in the province.  As most of the few roads in the region were on the coast because of the rugged interior, much of the transport infrastructure was damaged or destroyed.  Helicopters and Indonesian navy ships off the coast supplied a small amount of aid.

On approach to the Sultan Iskandar Muda Airport in Banda Aceh, a heavy cargo plane hit a water buffalo which had strayed onto the runway on 4 January 2005. The left side of the plane's undercarriage collapsed, making the plane un-movable blocking the runway for a big part of that day, except for helicopters, until specialists from Singapore put a temporary support under that part of the plane, and men moved the plane off the runway.

Four planes carrying aid were sent by Australia and one from the US carrying an evaluation team.  An Australian ship carrying helicopters set sail, but did not reach Sumatra until 14 January 2005.  A US Navy aircraft carrier battle group centred on USS Abraham Lincoln, dispatched to assist Aceh, began ferrying small amounts of supplies to the remnants of small coastal communities.  The US relief operation was based at the Thai base of Utapao.

In Aceh some elephants from a wildlife park were used to move debris. (Elephants were also used in Thailand).

See also
 2006 Yogyakarta earthquake
 2006 Pangandaran earthquake and tsunami

References

External links 
The Jakarta Post newspaper (Indonesia)
Banda Aceh, Indonesia Quickbird satellite image, DigitalGlobe Inc., 2004-12-28
Surf Aid International surfers seek to give back to their favorite surfing spots
NiasIsland.com an open content site made by Niasians and (former) visitors to Nias
Aceh IT-Media Center a relief coordinating site/media center from the Indonesian IT community
Indonesia HELP Aid and donations information blog for earthquake and tsunami victims in Aceh & North Sumatra (Indonesia)
IndonesiaHelp.ORG collection of news/articles from other resources (in some languages).
Mapping the destruction – BBC

Indonesia
Post-Suharto era
2004 in Indonesia
Natural disasters in Indonesia